Röthelbach is a small river of Bavaria, Germany. It springs southeast of Traunstein. It is a right tributary of the Traun in Traunstein.

See also
List of rivers of Bavaria

References 

Rivers of Bavaria
Rivers of Germany